The Ones We Never Knew is the debut album of American country music singer Holly Williams. It was released on October 5, 2004 via Universal South Records. Its only single, "Sometimes", failed to chart, although it was made into a music video. Williams co-produced the album and wrote all twelve of its songs.

Critical reception

Giving the album three-and-a-half stars out of five, Stephen Thomas Erlewine of Allmusic called it "a classy, tasteful album", saying that the album showed Williams' songwriting ambition, but could have used more variances in tempo.

Track listing
All songs written by Holly Williams.
"Sometimes" – 3:01
"Everybody's Waiting for a Change" – 3:30
"Would You Still Have Fallen" – 3:50
"Take Me Down" – 3:04
"Between Your Lines" – 4:00
"I'll Only Break Your Heart" – 3:40
"Cheap Parades" – 3:49
"Man in the Making" – 3:29
"Memory of Me" – 2:59
"Velvet Sounds" – 4:16
"All as It Should Be" – 3:04
"Nothing More" – 5:02

Personnel
 David Angell – violin
 Monisa Angell – viola
 Tom Bukovac – acoustic guitar, electric guitar
 Larry Campbell – steel guitar
 Spencer Campbell – bass guitar, double bass
 David Davidson – viola, violin
 James DiGirolamo – keyboards
 Mike Haynes – flugelhorn, trumpet
 John Jackson – dobro
 Monroe James – keyboards
 Ken Lewis – drums, percussion
 Ethan Pilzer – bass guitar
 George Recile – drums
 Jeff Roach – piano
 Kevin Teel – electric guitar
 Matthew Walker – cello
 Holly Williams – acoustic guitar, piano, lead vocals, background vocals

References

2004 debut albums
Holly Williams albums
Show Dog-Universal Music albums